Jasin is a town and the seat of Jasin District in the Malaysian state of Malacca. It is governed by Jasin Municipal Council, which was formerly known as Jasin District Council  from 1 July 1978 until 1 January 2007 and the Jasin Rural District Council from 23 August 1957 until 1 July 1978.

Tourist attractions
 Agricultural Museum
 Jasin Square

Transportation
The Jasin Sentral bus station is located within the town.

Gallery

See also
 Alor Gajah
 Hang Tuah Jaya
 Malacca City

References

Jasin District
Towns in Malacca